The 2008 Dublin Horse Show was hosted by the Royal Dublin Society (R.D.S.) at Ballsbridge, Dublin, Ireland, taking place between 6 August and 10 August. The competition was named after its main sponsor, Fáilte Ireland.

The show events were divided into two main areas, showing horses and show jumping. The showing classes are a major showcase of the best of the Irish horse. Some classes are restricted to Irish-bred horses.

This article concentrates on the major show jumping competitions.

Results

6 August

Fáilte Stakes

Thirty-one riders competed in the 4,750 € Fáilte Stakes. The jumping height was 1.40 m for the Table A event. The top eight riders placed and received financial prizes.

Speed Stakes

Thirty-five riders competed in the 10,500 € Speed Stakes. The jumping height was 1.40 m for the Table C event. The top nine riders placed and received financial prizes.

Irish Sports Council Classic

Fifty-eight riders competed in the 21,000 € Irish Sports Council Classic. The jumping height was 1.50 m for the Table C event with jump-off. The top fifteen riders placed and received financial prizes.

7 August

Power and Speed

Fifty-three riders competed in the 21,000 € Power and Speed. The class was sponsored by Knight Frank LLP. The jumping height was 1.50 m for the Table A event. The top fourteen riders placed and received financial prizes.

Speed Derby

Twenty-nine riders competed in the 21,000 € Speed Derby. The jumping height was 1.40 m for the Table C event. The top eight riders placed and received financial prizes.

Six Bar

Nineteen riders competed in the 16,000 € Six Bar. The top eight riders placed and received financial prizes.

8 August

Samsung Super League

Eight teams of four riders competed in the 156,000 € Samsung Super League event, the seventh event in the 2008 Samsung Super League series. There were two rounds to the event, with all teams placing and receiving financial prizes.

9 August

Accumulator

Thirty-five riders competed in the 15,750 € Accumulator. The jumping height was from 1.35 m to 1.60 m for the accumulator with joker event. The top nine riders placed and received financial prizes.

Speed Derby

Forty-five riders competed in the 21,000 € Dublin Stakes. The jumping height was 1.50 m for the Table A event. The top twelve riders placed and received financial prizes.

Land Rover Puissance

Eleven riders competed in the 36,000 € Land Rover Puissance. The class was sponsored by Land Rover. The top five riders placed and received financial prizes.

10 August

Speed Championship

Twenty riders competed in the 26,000 € Speed Championship. The class was sponsored by Walls Construction Ltd. The jumping height from 1.40 m to 1.50 m for the Table C event. The top seven riders placed and received financial prizes.

Longines International Grand Prix

Thirty-nine riders competed in the 130,000 € Longines International Grand Prix. The class was sponsored by Longines. The jumping height was 1.50 m for the Table A event which occurred over two rounds. The top ten riders placed and received financial prizes.

External links
Official website

Dublin
Dublin Horse Show
2008 in Irish sport
2000s in Dublin (city)
Dublin Horse Show
August 2008 events in Europe